Lieutenant General Douglas McKenzie Chalmers,  (born 26 February 1966) is a former British Army officer who served as Deputy Chief of the Defence Staff (Military Strategy & Operations) from 2018 to 2021. He is currently Master of Emmanuel College, Cambridge.

Early life and education
Chalmers was born on 26 February 1966 in Belfast, Northern Ireland. He was educated at Reddam House, a Private school in Berkshire, England. He later completed a Master of Arts (MA) degree from the United States Army's School of Advanced Military Studies and a Master of Philosophy (MPhil) degree from Trinity Hall, Cambridge.

Military career
He became commanding officer of the 2nd Battalion, Princess of Wales's Royal Regiment in July 2007 and, in that role, was deployed to Helmand Province, Afghanistan. He went on to become commander of the 12th Mechanized Brigade in October 2011 and was deployed as commander of Task Force Helmand in April 2012. After that he became the Chief of the Defence Staff's Liaison Officer to the United States Chairman of the Joint Chiefs of Staff in October 2013 and Assistant Chief of Staff (Operations) at Permanent Joint Headquarters in August 2014.

Chalmers was deployed on Operation Inherent Resolve in Iraq in September 2015, and became Deputy Commanding General-Support, III Corps and Fort Hood in August 2016. He was appointed Commander 1st Class of the Order of the Dannebrog by the Queen of Denmark in May 2018. He was promoted to lieutenant general and was appointed Deputy Chief of the Defence Staff (Military Strategy & Operations) on 18 June 2018. He was appointed Companion of the Order of the Bath (CB) in the 2021 Birthday Honours. Chalmers was appointed as Colonel Commandant of the Queen's Division in November 2021, and officially retired from the British Army on 19 February 2022.

Subsequent career
In February 2021, it was announced that Chalmers would succeed Fiona Reynolds as Master of Emmanuel College, Cambridge. He took up the post on 1 October 2021.

References

|-

1966 births
Military personnel from Belfast
British Army lieutenant generals
Companions of the Order of the Bath
Companions of the Distinguished Service Order
Officers of the Order of the British Empire
Royal Irish Rangers officers
Living people
Alumni of Trinity Hall, Cambridge
Non-U.S. alumni of the Command and General Staff College
Princess of Wales's Royal Regiment officers
Masters of Emmanuel College, Cambridge